Bernard Béguin (born 24 September 1947 in Grenoble) is a former French rally driver, who won the Tour de Corse in 1987, a round of the World Rally Championship.

Career
A regular competitor on the Tour de Corse, Béguin scored his first World Rally Championship points by finishing third on the 1985 Tour de Corse in a Porsche 911. He returned two years later in a BMW M3 and won the rally. He scored points finishes on the event on three later occasions.

Béguin won the French Rally Championship four times, in 1979, 1991, 1992 and 1993.

WRC victories
{|class="wikitable"
! # 
!Event
!Season
!Co-driver
!Car
|-
|1
| 31ème Tour de Corse - Rallye de France
|1987
|Jean-Jacques Lenne
|BMW M3
|}

See also
 Louis_Meznarie

References

External links
Profile at World Rally Archive
Profile at RallyBase

Living people
1947 births
Sportspeople from Grenoble
French rally drivers
World Rally Championship drivers
24 Hours of Le Mans drivers